Kevin O'Connell (born October 3, 1948) is an American broadcast personality.

Early life
O'Connell was born in Buffalo, New York and attended Buffalo State College. His father is George O'Connell, the City Comptroller who led to effort to save the Shea's Performing Arts Center after it had fallen prey to taxes. His sister is Mary Kate O'Connell, a stage actress and WBBZ-TV host. His son Kevin Jr. is a chef who has operated restaurants and food trucks in Buffalo and Los Angeles.

Career
O'Connell was chief weather anchor for WGRZ-TV, the NBC affiliate in Buffalo, New York, from the mid-1990s until 2018. O'Connell also sub-hosted on The David Letterman Show on NBC, hosted the game show Go on NBC from October 1983 to January 1984, and presented the syndicated disco series Disco Step-by-Step from 1977 to 1980. He was often a substitute weathercaster for Weekend Today during the 1990s. He also hosted the 1986 and 1987 game show pilots Keynotes and Money in the Blank.

O'Connell was previously a news and weather anchor for Buffalo's WIVB, as well as Los Angeles TV stations KNBC (1982-1985), KCBS-TV (1985-1988) and KABC-TV (1989-1990) before returning to Buffalo in 1990. He was also a disc jockey early in his career, before moving into work in weather; as late as 2012, O'Connell was voice-tracking a shift at WECK in addition to his television duties.

Since joining WGRZ in 1993, O'Connell's primary focus has been weather forecasting, and he obtained an American Meteorological Society seal of approval as a result of his work there. O'Connell does not go by the title of meteorologist since he does not hold a bachelor's degree in the science of meteorology (he received his AMS seal before a degree became a requirement for it); he has some meteorology education from Buffalo State College, from which he graduated in 1972.

O'Connell was expected to retire near the end of 2016; his heir apparent, meteorologist Patrick Hammer, was hired in June 2015 and was originally to work his way into the position as O'Connell winds down his duties with WGRZ; this was complicated when Hammer was pulled off the air in November 2015 after a repeat driving under the influence arrest. Hammer was retained for mornings (where he worked in a previous market) while Heather Waldman, a former Accuweather on-air personality, will take over most of O'Connell's shifts.

Political career
O'Connell, a registered Democrat, was briefly courted as a potential candidate for Erie County clerk in 2017 but declined the offer. As of that time, his contract with WGRZ ran through the end of 2018. O'Connell was fired from WGRZ in July 2018 in a dispute over his legal work (weather anchors and meteorologists routinely provide testimony in court, which is forbidden under Tegna, Inc.'s policy without express permission) and his endorsement of a local attorney. O'Connell was afforded an on-air sendoff.

Post-meteorology
In September 2018, Kevin O'Connell was named Chief of Community Connections at Catholic Health. In this role, O'Connell is focused on creating new ties between the health system, community service organizations, and residents, helping to ensure that the organization is able to meet the healthcare needs of Western New Yorkers.

References

 WGRZ profile

American game show hosts
Buffalo State College alumni
Radio personalities from Buffalo, New York
Living people
American television meteorologists
1948 births
New York (state) Democrats
Scientists from New York (state)